The Mathews PUP (Perfect Ultralight Plane), also called the P.U.P., is an American ultralight aircraft that was designed by Lyle Mathews in 1983 and made available in the form of plans for amateur construction.

Design and development
It features a biplane wing arrangement, a single-seat, open cockpit, conventional landing gear and a single engine in tractor configuration.

The aircraft is made from aluminum tubing and covered in Dacron sailcloth. Its  span, unstaggered wings employ both interplane struts and cable bracing. The lower wing has less span than the upper wing. The fuselage consists of a single aluminum rectangular 2x3 inch (5 X 8 cm) tube. The standard recommended engine is a Kawasaki 440 snowmobile engine that produces  and yields a  cruise speed along with a rate of climb of 600 feet per minute (3.0 m/s).

Specifications (PUP)

References

External links
Photo of a PUP

PUP
1980s United States ultralight aircraft
Homebuilt aircraft
Single-engined tractor aircraft